Alan Rees may refer to:
 Alan Rees (racing driver) (born 1938), British racing driver
 Alan Rees (composer) (1941–2005), Welsh Roman Catholic monk, organist and composer 
 Alan Rees (rugby) (1938–2022), Welsh rugby union and rugby league footballer, and cricketer